Piano Trio No. 6 may refer to:

 Piano Trios, Op. 70 (Beethoven)
 Piano Trio No. 6 (Mozart)